Clistopyga crassicaudata is a species of ichneumon wasp in the family Ichneumonidae which was first described in 2018. It is found in Peru and was one of seven new species found in a narrow zone of vegetation between the Amazon rainforest and the Andes. It received attention in the news due to the size of the female stinger/ovipositor.

References

Pimplinae
Hymenoptera of South America
Invertebrates of Peru
Insects described in 2018